Kherkh  is an urban-type settlement in the Mandal district of Selenge Province in northern Mongolia. Kherkh has a bridge and paved road connection to the city.

Populated places in Mongolia